Ernest Louis Antoine Grenet called Ernest Grenet-Dancourt ( 21 February 1854 – 10 February 1913) was a French playwright, poet and songwriter.

Life 
Born in the 10th arrondissement of Paris, after studying at the Lycée Saint-Louis, Grenet became a maître d'études, then a bank clerk, before embarking on a career as an actor at the Théâtre de l'Odéon, which he abandoned for good in 1881 to devote himself exclusively to writing.

His plays were performed on the greatest Parisian stages of the 19th century: Théâtre de Cluny, Théâtre des Nouveautés, Théâtre de l'Ambigu-Comique, Théâtre de l'Odéon, etc.

Grenet died in the 9th arrondissement of Paris aged 66.

Awards 
 Chevalier de la Légion d'honneur (décret du ministre de l'Instruction publique et des Beaux-Arts du 14 décembre 1900). Parrain : Victorien Sardou.
 Officier de l'Instruction publique.

Work 
Monologues :
 La Nuit terrible, badinage en vers, 1879
 Adam et Eve, bouffonnerie en vers, 1879
 Les Voyages, monologue comique, 1882
 Les Joies matrimoniales, monologue comique en vers, 1890
 Les Enfants de l'ivrogne, poème dramatique, 1880
 Une distraction, monologue en vers, 1880
 Paris, monologue comique dit by Coquelin aîné, 1882
 La chasse, monologue comique dit by Coquelin aîné, 1882
 Monologues comiques et dramatiques, P. Ollendorff, 1883
 L'Homme qui bâille, monologue comique, 1884
 Le Bon Dieu, monologue comique, 1884
 J'ai rêvé !, monologue comique, 1887
 L'Ancien temps, monologue comique, 1887
 Thermidor !, raconté par X..., sociétaire de la Comédie-française, 1891
 Le Matador, monologue comique, 1888
 La Vie, monologue comique, 1891
 Le Ventomane, monologue comique, soupiré par X..., sociétaire de la Comédie-française, 1893
 A Guillaume II, P. Ollendorff, 1895
 Le Récit de Théramène, monologue comique, 1895
 La Jeune Fille, monologue comique, dit by Maurice de Féraudy, 1896
 Graine de bourgeoise !, monologue comique en vers, 1906
 Pauvre bête !, monologue comique dit by Émile Duard, 1906
 Socialiste, monologue comique en vers dit by Paul Clerget, 1906
 Choses à dire, comiques et dramatiques, Paul Ollendorff, 1910

Theatre :
 1881 : Rival pour rire, one-act comedy
 1882 : Divorçons-nous ?, one-act comedy
 1882 : La Femme, saynète en 1 acte 
 1882 : Les Noces de mademoiselle Loriquet, comedy in 3 acts 
 1884 : Trois femmes pour un mari, comédie-bouffe in 3 acts 
 1884 : Oscar Bourdoche, one-act comedy 
 1886 : La banque de l'univers, comedy in five acts 
 1887 : Rigobert, vaudeville in 3 acts, with Paul Burani
 1887 : La véritable histoire de Pierrot
 1888 : Les Mariés de Mongiron, comédie-bouffe in 3 acts 
 1888 : Hypnotisée !, one-act comedy
 1890 : La Revanche du mari, comedy in 3 acts, with Félix Cohen 
 1890 : La Scène à faire, comédie conjugale in 1 act 
 1891 : Norah la dompteuse, vaudeville in 3 acts, with Georges Bertal 
 1891 : L'Abbé Vincent, one-act comedy
 1892 : L'Heure du bain, one-act comedy
 1893 : Le Torchon brûle !, comédie conjugale in 1 act 
 1893 : Le Voyage des Berluron, vaudeville in 4 acts, with Maurice Ordonneau and Henri Kéroul (play revived in 1903)
 1894 : Le Moulin de Javelle, opéra-comique in 1 act, music by Paul Henrion 
 1895 : Les gaîtés de l'année, revue de l'année 1894 in 2 acts and three scenes, with Octave Pradels 
 1895 : Jour de divorce, one-act comedy, with Gaston Pollonnais
 1895 : La Petite veuve !, one-act comedy 
 1895 : Le Phoque, one-act comedy
 1895 : La Macaroni, vaudeville in 2 acts, interspersed with songs, with Octave Pradels 
 1895 : Trop aimé, comédie-bouffe en 3 actes 
 1896 : Paris quand même ! ou les Deux Bigorret, comédie-bouffe in 3 acts, with Maurice Ordonneau 
 1896 : La Sauterelle, one-act comedy
 1898 : Celle qu'il faut aimer, one-act comedy, with Gaston Pollonnais
 1898 : Ceux qui restent !, one-act comedy 
 1900 : Ceux qu'on trompe !, one-act comedy 
 1901 : Le fils surnaturel, comédie-bouffe en 3 actes 
 1902 : Le Vampire, one-act comedy 
 1904 : L'Assassinée, comedy in 4 acts, after a short story by Gaston Bergeret 
 1904 : Beauté fatale ou fatale beauté, poème mobile 
 1904 : Les Gaîtés du veuvage, comédie-bouffe in 3 acts 
 1905 : L'Agrafe, one-act comedy, with Jean Destrem
 1906 : La Veuve de Taupin, bouffonnerie in 1 act, in verses 
 1908 : Les Tribulations d'un gendre 
 1908 : Le Mendiant d'amour, opereta in 3 acts and 4 scenes, with Louis Marsolleau, music by Henri José 
 1910 : Chou blanc !, play in 3 acts, with Robert Dieudonné 
 1911 : L'Heure du bain, saynète en 1 acte 
 1911 : Par-ci, par-là, revue passe-partout, with Octave Pradels 
 1913 : Le Trésor dans la nuit, one-act comedy, with José Germain, created at the Theatre of Sens, 9 November 1913. This is the last play written by Ernest Grenet-Dancourt.
 Non représenté : Fin de flirt, one-act comedy, published in March 1913 at Albert Méricant éditeur à Paris.

Film adaptations 
 1913: Trois femmes pour un mari by Charles Prince, based on the comedy-bouffe in 3 acts by Ernest Grenet-Dancourt (1884), adapted by Georges Monca.
 1919: Il viaggio di Berluron, Italian film by Camillo De Riso after Le Voyage de Berluron, vaudeville in four acts by Ernest Grenet-Dancourt, Maurice Ordonneau and Henri Kéroul (1893).

References

Further reading 
 Jules Martin, Nos auteurs et compositeurs dramatiques, 1897, 
 Noël Richard, À l'aube du symbolisme: hydropathes, fumistes et décadents, 1961,

External links 
 Ernest Grenet-Dancourt sur Discogs
 Grenet-Dancourt sur artlyriquefr
 

19th-century French dramatists and playwrights
20th-century French dramatists and playwrights
19th-century French poets
20th-century French poets
French chansonniers
Chevaliers of the Légion d'honneur
1854 births
1913 deaths
Writers from Paris